Antuan Mayorov (born 13 August 1971) is a Belarusian association football coach and former player and referee.

After retiring from playing, Mayorov worked as a referee for several seasons in Belarusian Premier League, after which he switched to coaching.

His father Ivan Mayorov was also a referee, who worked in Soviet and Belarusian leagues in the 1980s and 90s.

Honours
Dinamo Minsk
 Belarusian Premier League champion: 1993–94, 1994–95, 1995
 Belarusian Cup winner: 1993–94

Gomel
 Belarusian Cup winner: 2001–02

References

External links
 

1971 births
Living people
Soviet footballers
Belarusian footballers
Association football midfielders
Belarusian expatriate footballers
Expatriate footballers in Ukraine
Belarusian expatriate sportspeople in Ukraine
Expatriate footballers in Russia
Belarusian expatriate sportspeople in Russia
Expatriate footballers in Lithuania
Belarusian expatriate sportspeople in Lithuania
FC Vitebsk players
FC Khimik Severodonetsk players
FC Lokomotiv Vitebsk (defunct) players
FC Dinamo Minsk players
FC Dinamo-93 Minsk players
FC Torpedo NN Nizhny Novgorod players
FC Lokomotiv Nizhny Novgorod players
FC Torpedo Minsk players
FC Gomel players
FK Žalgiris players
FC Oshmyany players
Belarusian football referees
Belarusian football managers